Pyropelta is a genus of small sea snails, deep-water limpets, marine gastropod mollusks in the family Pyropeltidae. 

The name Pyropelta is from the Greek; it means "fire limpet" because these small deepwater limpets live near hot hydrothermal vents and similar habitat.

Species
Species within the genus Pyropelta include:
 Pyropelta bohlei L. Beck, 1996
 Pyropelta corymba McLean & Haszprunar, 1987
 Pyropelta craigsmithi (J. H. McLean, 1992)
 Pyropelta elongata S.Q. Zhang & S.P. Zhang, 2017
 Pyropelta musaica McLean & Haszprunar, 1987
 Pyropelta oluae Warén & Bouchet, 2009
 Pyropelta ryukyuensis Sasaki, Okutani & Fujikura, 2008
 Pyropelta sibuetae Warén & Bouchet, 2009
 Pyropelta wakefieldi McLean, 1992
 Pyropelta yamato Sasaki, Okutani & Fujikura, 2003

References

External links
 McLean J.H. & Haszprunar G. (1987). Pyropeltidae, a new family of cocculiniform limpets from hydrothermal vents. The Veliger. 30(2): 196-205

Pyropeltidae